Augustus Downs Station is a pastoral lease that operates as a cattle station in the Gulf Country of outback Queensland.

The Leichhardt River and numerous tributaries flow through the property. 

Oscar John de Satgé acquired the property in around 1881 along with Carandotta Station after selling Coreena Station for £70,000.

In 1901 the property shared a boundary with Lorraine Station, although it was not fenced and cattle from both properties grazed in each other's pastures.

Sidney Kidman was a director of the Augustus Downs Pastoral Company until 1935. William Charles Angliss was also a director in the company.

In 2003 the property was owned by the Stanbroke Pastoral Company.

See also
List of ranches and stations

References

Pastoral leases in Queensland
Stations (Australian agriculture)
North West Queensland